is a passenger railway station located in the city of  Inabe, Mie Prefecture, Japan, operated by the private railway operator Sangi Railway.

Lines
Ageki Station is the terminus of the Hokusei Line, and is located 20.4 kilometres from the opposing terminus of the line at Nishi-Kuwana Station.

Layout
The station consists of a single deadheaded island platform, with trains bound for Nishi-Kuwana using either side of the platform.

Platforms

Adjacent stations

History
July 8, 1931:  Station opens as part of Hokusei Railway.
June 27, 1934:  Hokusei Railway officially renamed Hokusei Electric Railway.
February 11, 1944:  Station falls under the ownership of Sanco following merger.
February 1, 1964:  Station falls under the ownership of Mie Electric Railway after railway division of Sanco splits off and forms separate company.
April 1, 1965:  Station falls under the ownership of Kintetsu following merger.
March 25, 1977:  Platform length extended from 51 m to 61 m.
March 31, 1978:  Platform length extended from 61 m to 71 m
October 1, 1999:  Automatic ticket machine installed.  Stations becomes unmanned.
April 1, 2003:  Kintetsu transfers control of Hokusei Line to Sangi Railway.  Station falls under the ownership of Sangi.
March 15, 2004:  Free parking lot opens outside of station.
February 14, 2006:  New platform opens.
March 23, 2006:  Second terminal track opens.
December 1, 2006:  New station building opens.

Passenger statistics
In fiscal 2019, the station was used by an average of 320 passengers daily (boarding passengers only).

Surrounding area
former Hokusei Town Hall
Ageki Onsen

See also
List of railway stations in Japan

References

External links

Sangi Railway official home page

Railway stations in Japan opened in 1931
Railway stations in Mie Prefecture
Inabe, Mie